Jan Stary (born February 7, 1986) is a Czech professional ice hockey player. He is a free agent having last played for LHK Jestřábi Prostějov of the Chance Liga.

He previously played with HC Pardubice in the Czech Extraliga.

Career statistics

References

External links

1986 births
Czech ice hockey forwards
HC Dynamo Pardubice players
LHK Jestřábi Prostějov players
KLH Vajgar Jindřichův Hradec players
Living people
BK Mladá Boleslav players
Sportspeople from Pardubice
Stadion Hradec Králové players
AZ Havířov players